Frechinia is a genus of moths of the family Crambidae.

Species
Frechinia criddlealis (Munroe, 1951)
Frechinia helianthiales (Murtfeldt, 1897)
Frechinia laetalis (Barnes & McDunnough, 1914)
Frechinia lutosalis (Barnes & McDunnough, 1914)
Frechinia texanalis Munroe, 1961

Former species
Frechinia murmuralis (Dyar, 1917)

References

Odontiini
Crambidae genera
Taxa named by Eugene G. Munroe